Edward Collins (1 February 1941 – 4 March 2019) was an Irish Fine Gael politician. 

He first stood for election in the Waterford constituency at a by-election in 1966, but was unsuccessful. He was first elected to Dáil Éireann as a Fine Gael Teachta Dála (TD) for the Waterford constituency at the 1969 general election and was re-elected at each subsequent election until he was defeated at the 1987 general election. 

He served as a Minister of State at the Department of Industry and Energy under the 1981–82 coalition and was reappointed after the second 1982 election. He moved to the position of Minister of State at the Department of Trade, Commerce and Tourism from 1983 until his dismissal in September 1986, after refusing the Taoiseach Garret FitzGerald's request to resign because of failure to disclose a conflict of interest. This related to his involvement with the Collins family's lamb processing businesses; he had stepped down as director of them upon appointment as junior minister, but an article by Fintan O'Toole in Magill revealed he subsequently attended a meeting discussing a loan application to Agricultural Credit Corporation, a state body. FitzGerald called Collins' action "inadverten[t] and clearly without any improper intent" and the dismissal his "most painful personal decision" as Taoiseach; some party colleagues felt FitzGerald was too fastidious about appearance of impropriety.

Collins died on 4 March 2019, aged 78.

References

1941 births
2019 deaths
Fine Gael TDs
Members of the 19th Dáil
Members of the 20th Dáil
Members of the 21st Dáil
Members of the 22nd Dáil
Members of the 23rd Dáil
Members of the 24th Dáil
Politicians from County Waterford
Ministers of State of the 24th Dáil
Ministers of State of the 22nd Dáil
Irish business executives